Gail Matthius (born December 14, 1953) is an American actress and comedian. She was a cast member of NBC's Saturday Night Live during its critical and ratings low point at the time (the 1980–1981 season, produced by Jean Doumanian), and co-anchored the Weekend Update segment with Charles Rocket in 1981.

Saturday Night Live
Matthius had worked as a comedian in Los Angeles appearing at The Comedy Store before successfully auditioning for Doumanian's cast.

In 2015, the magazine Rolling Stone ranked Matthius at, out of 141 cast members, the 74th best of Saturday Night Live, calling her, "A flicker of hope in the Saturday Night Live 1980 debacle, with a sharp valley girl mall-chick character named Vickie. Matthius and Vickie both deserved better."

Recurring characters
Vickie, a valley girl who, along with her friend, Debbie (played by Denny Dillon), annoy people with their persistent questions and shallow statements.
Roweena, a Midwestern-accented hairdresser who often has a neurotic, middle-aged woman named Nadine (played by Denny Dillon) as a frequent customer.
Frances Lively, wife to Charles Rocket's Phil Lively, a fellow game show host who lives life at home as if it were just another game show.

Celebrity impersonations
Brooke Shields, in a parody of the racy Calvin Klein TV advertisements that featured her.
Irene Cara
Nancy Reagan
Mary Cunningham

Post-SNL

Following her stint on SNL, Matthius appeared in the short-lived British/American sketch show Assaulted Nuts and the syndicated sketch comedy series Laugh Trax (where she revived her valley girl Vicki character from SNL).

She had some voice acting work for animated shows from the late 1980s into the 1990s, including Bobby's World (with Laugh Trax co-star Howie Mandel), Tiny Toon Adventures, Animaniacs, The Ren & Stimpy Show, Bump in the Night and The Tick, often using the voice of her valley girl and Roweena characters from Saturday Night Live (in characters such as Martha, who sounds like Roweena, and Shirley the Loon from Tiny Toon Adventures).

Matthius is a member of the Spolin Players Improv comedy troupe and works as a drama coach for various acting studios, including Theatre Palisades in Pacific Palisades, California. In 2016, Matthius appeared in the play For Piano and Harpo by Dan Castellaneta.

References

External links
 

1953 births
Living people
Actresses from South Dakota
American impressionists (entertainers)
American sketch comedians
American stage actresses
American television actresses
American voice actresses
American women comedians
People from Sioux Falls, South Dakota
21st-century American women